Peixotoa is a genus in the Malpighiaceae, a family of about 75 genera of flowering plants in the order Malpighiales. Peixotoa comprises 29 species of vines, shrubs, and subshrubs native to Brazil and adjacent Paraguay and Bolivia.

External links and references
Peixotoa from the University of Michigan Herbarium
Malpighiaceae Malpighiaceae - description, taxonomy, phylogeny, and nomenclature
Anderson, C. 1982. A monograph of the genus Peixotoa (Malpighiaceae). Contributions from the University of Michigan Herbarium 15: 1–92.
Anderson, C. 2001. Peixotoa floribunda (Malpighiaceae), a new species from Paraguay. Contributions from the  University of Michigan Herbarium 23: 49–52.

Malpighiaceae
Malpighiaceae genera
Flora of Brazil
Flora of Bolivia
Flora of Paraguay
Taxa named by Adrien-Henri de Jussieu